Eoin (or ) is an Irish name. It is also cognate with the Irish . In the Irish language, it is the name used for all Biblical figures known as John in English, including John the Baptist and John the Apostle.

/ are different names from  /. The early Irish Eógan and Gaelic Eòghan are generally considered to be derivations of the Greek and Latin name , meaning "noble born".

Political figures
 Eoin an Ile or John of Islay, Earl of Ross, in the 15th century
 Eoin Ó Broin (born 1972), Irish Sinn Féin politician 
 Eoin O'Duffy (1890 — 1944), Irish revolutionary, leader of the Blueshirts.
 Eoin Mac Neill (1867 — 1945), Irish nationalist politician and scholar.
 Eóin Tennyson, Northern Irish politician

Artists 
 Eoin Colfer, Irish author of the Artemis Fowl series
 Eoin McNamee, Irish author
 Eoin O'Broin, Irish DJ and producer under the stage name Noisestorm
 Eoin O'Keeffe, Irish composer
 Eoin Scolard, Irish author
 Eoin Sandison, Marcus, Scottish musician of the duo Boards of Canada
 Eoin McCarthy, Irish actor
 Eoin Macken, Irish actor

Sportsmen

Gaelic Athletic Association

Gaelic footballers
 Eoin Bradley, a Derry player
 Eoin Brosnan, a three-time All Ireland winning Kerry player
 Eoin Cotter, a Cork player
 Eoin Donnelly, a Fermanagh player
 Eoin Liston, a Kerry Gaelic football legend
 Eoin McHugh (born 1994/5), a Donegal player

Hurlers
 Eoin Cadogan, a Cork hurler and footballer
 Eoin Kelly (Tipperary hurler), an All-Ireland winning Tipperary player
 Eoin Kelly (Waterford hurler), a three-time Munster Championship winning Waterford player
 Eoin Larkin, a seven-time All-Ireland winning Kilkenny hurler
 Eoin McGrath, a three-time Munster championship winning Waterford hurler
 Eoin Murphy, a three-time Munster Championship winning Waterford hurler
 Eoin Quigley, a Wexford hurler and former Bohemians soccer player

Soccer players
 Eoin Doyle, a Cardiff City player
 Eoin Hand, soccer analyst and former manager of the Irish Soccer Team
 Eoin Jess, a former Scottish international and Aberdeen player
 Eoin Reid, a Celtic reserves player
Eoin Mullen, a Bohemian FC player

Other
 Eoin Collins, a former Irish tennis player
 Eoin Kennedy, an All-Ireland winning handballer
 Eoin Morgan, an Irish cricketer who now represents England
 Eoin Murray, an Irish British Touring Car Championship driver
 Eoin Reddan, an Irish Rugby international
 Eoin Reilly, a junior champion sculler and rower from New Zealand
 Eoin Rheinisch, an Irish canoeist

Others
 Eoin Cameron, an Australian radio personality
 Eóin Mac Suibhne, fourteenth-century Scottish nobleman
 Eoin Macken, Irish actor and model
 Eoin McKiernan, an academic in the field of Irish Studies
 Eoin McLove, a fictional character in the sitcom Father Ted

See also 
 Eoghan
 Iain
 Owen (name)
 Eugene (given name)
 Alternate forms for the name John

References